The 2022 Pensacola mayoral election took place on August 23, 2022, to elect the mayor of Pensacola. Local Entrepreneur and businessman D. C. Reeves was elected during the primary by earning the majority, 7,682 votes (51.11%), against three opponents, Jewell Cannada-Wynn, Sherri Myers and Steven Sharp. Because Reeves earned the majority in the primary, there was no runoff on November 8 and Reeves took office on November 22, when Incumbent Mayor Grover C. Robinson IV stepped down after one term. At age 38, Reeves will became the youngest Pensacolian to hold the office in 101 years.

Candidates 

 D. C. Reeves, businessman, chairman of the board for Visit Pensacola
 Jewel Cannada-Wynn, former city councilmember, dean at Escambia High School
 James Hillburn (Did not qualify) 
 Tim Horton, U.S. Navy veteran, businessman, (Did not qualify)
 David Morgan (Withdrawn), former sheriff of Escambia County
 Sherri Myers, councilmember
 Andy Romagnano (Withdrawn)
 Steve Sharp, Former division chief of the Protection Services Department of the Escambia County School District, former Deputy Sheriff, former firefighter

Debates 
On March 15, 2022, the East Hill Neighborhood Association hosted a forum with candidates Cannada-Wynn, Hillburn, Horton, Reeves, and Sharp.

On May 26, 2022, Women for Responsible Legislation hosted a forum with candidates Cannada-Wynn, Myers, Reeves, and Sharp.

Results

See also 
2022 Florida elections

References

External links 
Official campaign websites
 D. C. Reeves for Mayor
Steve Sharp for Mayor

Official list of candidates
 List of candidates

2022 Florida elections
Pensacola